These are the official results of the women's 4 × 100 metres relay event at the 1992 Summer Olympics in Barcelona, Spain. There were a total of fourteen nations competing.

Medalists

* Athletes who participated in the heats only and received medals.

Records
These were the standing world and Olympic records (in seconds) prior to the 1992 Summer Olympics.

Results

Final

Heats 
Qualification: First 3 of each heat (Q) plus the 2 fastest times (q) advance to the final.

See also
 1990 Women's European Championships 4 × 100 m Relay (Split)
 1991 Women's World Championships 4 × 100 m Relay (Tokyo)
 1993 Women's World Championships 4 × 100 m Relay (Stuttgart)
 1994 Women's European Championships 4 × 100 m Relay (Helsinki)

References

External links
 Official Report
 Results

R
Relay foot races at the Olympics
1992 in women's athletics
Women's events at the 1992 Summer Olympics